The 2019 Levene Gouldin & Thompson Tennis Challenger was a professional tennis tournament played on hard court. It was the 26th edition of the tournament which was part of the 2019 ATP Challenger Tour. It took place in Binghamton, United States between 22 and 28 July 2019.

Singles main-draw entrants

Seeds

 1 Rankings are as of July 15, 2019.

Other entrants
The following players received wildcards into the singles main draw:
  Andrew Fenty
  Mitchell Krueger
  Alexander Ritschard
  Noah Rubin
  Sergiy Stakhovsky

The following player received entry into the singles main draw using a protected ranking:
  Raymond Sarmiento

The following players received entry into the singles main draw as alternates:
  John Paul Fruttero
  Nathan Pasha
  Karl Poling
  Nathan Ponwith
  Bernardo Saraiva
  Volodymyr Uzhylovskyi

The following players received entry into the singles main draw using their ITF World Tennis Ranking:
  Preston Brown
  Lloyd Glasspool
  Diego Hidalgo
  Strong Kirchheimer
  Michail Pervolarakis
  Alexey Zakharov

Champions

Singles 

  Yūichi Sugita def.  João Menezes 7–6(7–2), 1–6, 6–2.

Doubles 

  Max Purcell /  Luke Saville def.  JC Aragone /  Alex Lawson 6–4, 4–6, [10–5].

References

External links
Official Website

2019 ATP Challenger Tour
2019
2019 in American tennis
July 2019 sports events in the United States